Eivets Rednow is an easy listening instrumental album by Stevie Wonder released on the Gordy Records label in 1968. The album was created as a follow-up to the successful easy listening instrumental single "Alfie". "A House Is Not a Home", another song by Burt Bacharach and Hal David, also appears on the album. Eivets Rednow is Stevie Wonder spelled backwards; Wonder's name does not appear on the cover of the original releases. This was Wonder's ninth studio album, released on November 20, 1968.

Wonder plays the harmonica, drums, piano and clavinet on this album, though like his debut album, he does not sing on any of the tracks. On some reissues, "How do you spell Stevie Wonder backwards" is printed on the top corner of the album sleeve in small print.

This is also the first album that has song credits solely by Wonder himself.

Track listing

Side one
"Alfie" (Burt Bacharach, Hal David) – 3:14
"More than a Dream" (Henry Cosby, Stevie Wonder) – 3:48
"A House Is Not a Home" (Burt Bacharach, Hal David) – 3:32
"How Can You Believe" (Stevie Wonder) – 3:04
Medley: "Never My Love/Ask the Lonely" (Don Addrisi, Dick Addrisi/Ivy Jo Hunter, William "Mickey" Stevenson) – 2:30

Side two
"Ruby" (Mitchell Parish, Heinz Roemheld) – 6:48 
"Which Way the Wind" (Stevie Wonder) – 2:47
"Bye Bye World" (Stevie Wonder) – 3:21
"Grazin' in the Grass" (Philemon Hou) – 2:57

Personnel
Stevie Wonder – harmonica, keyboards, drums, percussion
Benny Benjamin – drums
James Jamerson – bass guitar
The Funk Brothers – instrumentation

References

1968 albums
Gordy Records albums
Stevie Wonder albums
Instrumental albums
Albums produced by Henry Cosby
Albums recorded at Hitsville U.S.A.